Stephen Samuel Johns (born November 25, 1960) is an American jazz drummer and educator.

Music career

Johns was born in Boston and started playing drums at the age of 9. His mother Goldie composed music. He studied with Alan Dawson in 1977 and attended the New England Conservatory of Music from 1979 to 1982. As a student, he won the Outstanding Drummer Award at the Notre Dame Collegiate Jazz Festival. In 1982, Johns moved to New York, where he played with John Hicks, Larry Coryell, Bobby Watson, Gary Bartz, Diane Schuur, Roy Hargrove, Randy Brecker, Stanley Turrentine, Thomas Chapin, and Benny Carter. He toured the US with the Count Basie Orchestra and Europe with the Gil Evans Orchestra and the Mingus Epitaph Orchestra conducted by Gunther Schuller. Johns played with George Russell's Living Time Orchestra from 1988 to 1993 and has been playing with the Mingus Big Band. He played in the Billy Taylor Trio on Jazz At The Kennedy Center, the radio show hosted by Taylor, for five years. More recently, he has played with Sonny Fortune and Bob DeVos.

Johns has taught at several music colleges, schools and jazz centers.

Reviewing his work on Shifting Sands and Playing For Keeps, David Orthman said: "Johns utilizes the drums and cymbals in something approximating an equal partnership... Changes in dynamics are frequent and unceremonious. A strong pocket is derived not only from the steady pulse of the ride cymbal, but from the manner in which he juxtaposes accents and patterns on the snare, bass, and tom toms."

Personal life

Johns is married to tenor saxophonist Debbie Keefe. Their son Daryl Johns is a jazz bassist.

Selected discography

As leader

No Saints No Sinners (Playscape, 2002)
Family (CD Baby/Strikezone Records, 2014)

Collaborations

With Bob DeVos
Shifting Sands (Savant, 2006)
Playing for Keeps (Savant, 2007)
Shadow Box (American Showplace Music, 2013)

With Sonny Fortune
Continuum (Sound Reason, 2004)
You and the Night and the Music (18th & Vine, 2007)
Last Night at Sweet Rhythm (Sound Reason, 2009)

As sideman

With Mario Pavone
Toulon Days (New World Records, 1992)
Dancer's Tales (Knitting Factory Works, 1997)
Street Songs (Playscape Recordings, 2013)

With Gary Smulyan
More Treasures (Reservoir, 2007)
High Noon: The Jazz Soul of Frankie Laine (Reservoir, 2009)

With Jessye Norman
Roots: My Life, My Song (Sony, 2007)

With Thomas Chapin
Third Force (Knitting Factory Works, 1991)
Anima (Knitting Factory Works, 1992)
I've Got Your Number (Arabesque, 1993)

'With Alan RosenthalJust Sayin''' (Alan Rosenthal, 2011)

References

External links
Official site
Discography at AllMusic

American jazz drummers
1960 births
Living people
Musicians from Boston
Male drummers
20th-century American drummers
American male drummers
New England Conservatory alumni
Jazz musicians from Massachusetts
20th-century American male musicians
American male jazz musicians